The 1950–51 Yorkshire Football League was the 25th season in the history of the Yorkshire Football League.

Division One

The division featured 4 new teams:

 Beighton Miners Welfare, promoted from Division Two
 Dinnington Athletic, promoted from Division Two
 Retford Town, promoted from Division Two
 Scarborough reserves, promoted from Division Two

Map

League table

Division Two

The division featured 3 new teams:
 Bradford United, joined from ??
 Chesterfield 'A', relegated from Division One
 Thorne Colliery, relegated from Division One

Map

League table

League Cup

Third Round

Semi-finals

Final

References

1950–51 in English football leagues
Yorkshire Football League